Thomas Upton Reynolds II (born November 15, 1954) is an American politician. He is a member of the Mississippi House of Representatives from the 33rd District, being first elected in 1980. He is a member of the Democratic party.

References

1954 births
Living people
Democratic Party members of the Mississippi House of Representatives
People from Charleston, Mississippi
21st-century American politicians